Paul David Fry (25 October 1964 – 1 April 2010) was a motorcycle speedway rider from England.

Career
Fry made his debut with the Cradley Heathens in 1984 and rode for a number of clubs during his career. He won several team trophies including the British League Knockout Cup with Cradley Heath in 1986 and 1987 and the Premier League Knockout Cup with the Swindon Robins in 2000.

In 2007, he was awarded a testimonial meeting at Somerset's Oak Tree Arena. He spent his final season in 2009 with Premier league team Newport Wasps and briefly doubled-up with the Poole Pirates.

Death
Fry died at his home in March 2010 aged 45. The cause of death has not been disclosed.

World Longtrack Championship

Finalist

1993 -   Mühldorf 5pts (15th).

References

1964 births
2010 deaths
British speedway riders
English motorcycle racers
Lakeside Hammers riders
Mildenhall Fen Tigers riders
Somerset Rebels riders
Cradley Heathens riders
Stoke Potters riders
Long Eaton Invaders riders
King's Lynn Stars riders
Exeter Falcons riders
Newport Wasps riders
Swindon Robins riders
Peterborough Panthers riders
Belle Vue Aces riders
Individual Speedway Long Track World Championship riders